Isozaki is a Japanese surname. Notable people with the surname include:

Arata Isozaki, Japanese architect
Chitoshi Isozaki (1913–1993), Japanese fighter pilot
Hiromi Isozaki (athlete) (born 1965), Japanese sprint athlete
Hiromi Isozaki (born 1975), maiden name of Japanese footballer Hiromi Ikeda
Keita Isozaki (born 1980), Japanese footballer
Naomi Isozaki, Japanese Paralympic archer
Yosuke Isozaki (born 1957), Japanese politician

See also
Isozaki Station, train station in Japan
Isozaki Atea, building in Spain

Japanese-language surnames